Greece–Israel relations are the bilateral relationship between the Hellenic Republic and the State of Israel. Relations between the two countries were strained during the late 20th century, but since 2008 they have been among the strongest in the Eastern Mediterranean. Israel and Greece consider each other as strong collaborators in the aspects of military, intelligence, economy and culture. Both countries are part of the Energy Triangle, which referred to the extraction of oil and gas from both Israel and Cyprus by 2015, which will be delivered to mainland Europe with a pipeline through Greece. The deterioration of Israel's relations with Turkey following the Gaza flotilla raid has heavily contributed to the strengthening of Greek-Israeli relations.

Greece and Israel today enjoy excellent diplomatic relations and consider each other an ally. Both countries are partners in the Organization for Security and Co-operation in Europe (OSCE), and members of the Union for the Mediterranean, the World Trade Organization (WTO) and other international organizations. Israel is the second largest importer of Greek products in the Middle East. Relations between the two countries are also reinforced by the over two millennia old Jewish presence in Greece (see Romaniotes), while Jerusalem is home to the Greek Orthodox Patriarchate of Jerusalem, which was recognized as a patriarchate in 451 by the Council of Chalcedon, and is one of the five patriarchates of the Pentarchy recognized by Justinian in the 6th century.

History

Before the 20th century

1940s

Along with Cuba, Greece was one of only two Christian-majority nations to vote against the United Nations Partition Plan for Palestine. This was mainly in order not to damage Greek-Arab economic ties, and to avert a threat to expel the Egyptian Greek community (which would eventually happen after Nasser's coming to power).

Following the signing of armistice agreements confirming Israel's survival in the aftermath of the 1948 Arab–Israeli War, Greece recognized the State of Israel on 15 March 1949, although it was diplomatically represented in Tel Aviv on a lower-than-embassy level.

1960–70s
Relations between Israel and Greece somewhat improved during the Greek junta which ruled from 1967 to 1974. The junta praised the "martial aspects of the Israeli state" and assisted the United States in supporting Israel during the Six-Day War. Greece also sent a consul to Jerusalem during this period, but refrained from granting full recognition to balance its relations with the Arab states.

1980 - 90s

In the 1990s, efforts were made to improve ties between the two countries and a defense cooperation agreement was signed. However, tensions existed, due to Greece's traditional support of the Palestinians, Greek favoritism towards the Arabs and support of Palestinian political violence, (particularly under the Prime Ministry of Andreas Papandreou, 1981–89 and 1993–96), as well as Israeli military cooperation with Turkey and controversies over the Greek Orthodox Patriarchate in Jerusalem. Bilateral trade doubled between 1989 and 1995. That year Israel exported $200 million worth of chemicals and oil products to Greece and imported $150 million worth of cement, food, and building materials.

2010s

Relations between Greece and Israel soared, following the May 2010 Gaza flotilla incident which soured Israel's relationship with Turkey. In August 2010, Prime Minister of Israel Benjamin Netanyahu became the first Israeli prime minister to visit Greece. On his two-day tour, Netanyahu and the Greek prime minister George Papandreou discussed the possibility of expanding strategic ties and establishing greater cooperation between the nations' militaries and defense industries. Israeli diplomats expressed their desire to expand ties with Greece. Israeli President Shimon Peres thanked Greece.

In June 2017 Prime Minister Netanyahu paid an official visit to Thessaloniki, meeting with members of the city's ancient Jewish community and visiting the historic Monastir synagogue.

2020s 

On January 2, 2020, Prime Ministers of Greece, Cyprus and Israel signed in Athens the EastMed gas pipeline deal

Current relations

Relations between Greece and Israel have improved since 1995 due to the decline of Israeli-Turkish relations under the AK Party of prime minister Erdoğan, Greece's desire to increase its deterrent power against Turkey and the improvement in U.S.-Greece relations. In 2006, President Moshe Katsav visited Greece, in what was the first official visit by an Israeli head of state.

Greece–Israel relations improved further as Turkish-Israel relations worsened in the aftermath of the Gaza flotilla raid in May 2010. In July 2010 Greek Prime minister George Papandreou (son of Andreas Papandreou) made an official visit to Israel after many years, in order to improve bilateral relations between the two countries. During Netanyahu's reciprocal visit in August 2010, the leaders of the two states discussed the Israeli-Palestinian conflict, Iran, and military and economic cooperation in a one-on-one meeting that lasted an hour and a half.
In January 2011 Foreign Minister of Israel Avigdor Liberman made a state visit to Athens. During that visit, the two countries reportedly set up a joint committee to study ways of improving cooperation on strategic and anti-terror issues.

Military collaboration

In October 2010, the Israeli and Greek air forces trained jointly in Greece. According to the BBC, this signified a boost in ties that was due in large part to Israel's rift with Turkey.

Israel was grateful to Greece for its role in thwarting the planned second Gaza flotilla in 2011.

In November 2011, the Israeli Air Force hosted Greece's Hellenic Air Force in a joint exercise at the Uvda base. Greece sent five F-16 block 52 fighter jets for a five-day exercise, which included practice air fights as well as ground attacks. Israeli F-15 and F-16 fighter jets also participated in the exercise, along with Boeing fuel supplier airplanes.
Similar training was held in 2012 by the IAF in cooperation with the Hellenic Air Force in the Peloponnese and parts of southern Greece in a response to the need of the IAF training of pilots in unfamiliar areas.

On March 14, 2013, the navies of Israel, Greece and the US held a two-week joint military exercise for the third year in a row. The annual operation is nicknamed Noble Dina and was established in 2011. Similar to Noble Dina in 2012, the exercise in 2013 included defending offshore natural gas platforms and simulated air-to-air combat and anti-submarine warfare.

Also, on March 27, 2017, Israel participated in the large-scale "Iniochus 2017" military exercise, which is organized annually by Greece, along with USA, Italy and the United Arab Emirates. Israel participated also in Iniochus (Iniohos) 2019 military exercise Flying over the Olympus.

Blue Flag

In November 2013, Israel hosted a "massive"aerial-maneuver drill, code-named "Blue Flag," at the Ovda air base, near the southern city of Eilat, in the Negev Desert, modeled after the US Air Force’s annual Red Flag exercise. The exercise included seven combat squadrons from the Israeli Air Force and one squadron each from the air forces of Greece, the United States, and Italy. Half of Israel's air space had been closed to traffic for the exercise, from approximately the center of the country southwards. Pilots practised attacks on enemy bases and tactics for defeating anti-aircraft measures, such as shoulder-held missiles, advanced surface-to-air missiles, and radar systems. Observers to the drill included military attachés and political representatives from Cyprus and Bulgaria.

Opening of military attaché office in Athens
In April 2014 the IDF and the Ministry of Defense of Israel announced the closure of their military attaché office in Switzerland during the summer of 2014. It was decided to open a new military attaché office in Greece due to the growing military cooperation between the two countries and as a counterweight to the decline of defense relations with Turkey. Until April 2014 the military attaché in Italy was also responsible for transactions and security relations in Greece, but after the announcement of the decision Athens will host a permanent military attaché who will address security relations between Greece and Israel directly.

Status of forces agreement
Greece is one of only three countries Israel has signed a Status of forces agreement (SOFA), with the other being the United States and Cyprus. The agreement enables Israel in hosting Greek military forces in its territory or stationing Israeli military forces in the territory of Greece, as part of the military agreements and comprehensive security arrangements between the two countries.

Energy cooperation

The joint Cyprus-Israel oil and gas explorations centered on the Leviathan gas field are also an important factor for Greece, given its strong links with Cyprus. ΔΕΗ-Quantum Energy, a Cyprus-based group including Greece's state-controlled power utility Public Power Corporation of Greece (PPC, also known as ΔΕΗ) is planning to lay the world's longest subsea power cable, linking Israel, Cyprus and Greece. The link, called the EuroAsia Interconnector project, would be the longest in the world.
The tripartite energy memorandum of understanding came after nearly a year of negotiations and was signed in Nicosia, Cyprus, by Energy and Water Resources Minister Silvan Shalom; Nicos Kouyialis, the Cypriot minister of agriculture, natural resources and environment; and George Lakkotrypis, the Greek minister for the environment, energy and climate change.

On 8 August Greece, Israel and Cyprus signed the tripartite energy memorandum of understanding after the completion of one year negotiation in Nicosia. Negotiations were held between the Energy and Water Resources Minister of Israel Silvan Shalom, the Cypriot minister of agriculture, natural resources and environment Nicos Kouyialis and the Greek minister of environment, energy and climate change George Lakkotrypis. The 2,000-mega-watt EuroAsia Interconnector is planned to lift Cyprus and Israel out of energy isolation through cheaper electricity as supported by George Lakkotrypis.
Silvan Shalom announced that the agreement is "historic" and insisted that it demonstrated the powerful relations between the countries the three countries adding that the electric conduit will become a cable and is going to export electricity to the European energy market. The Greek Prime Minister Antonis Samaras proclaimed in 2013 that Israel has a special role to play in supplying Europe with energy resources and supported that it can become a key energy hub.

Electricity connection between Cyprus, Israel and Greece

Electricity connection between Hadera of Israel and Vasilikos in Cyprus is one of the projects that will be funded by the European Union in the framework of the programme Connecting Europe Facility (CEF). According to a press release issued by the European Commission the amount earmarked for the Hadera Israel-Vasilikos Cyprus connection is approximately €1.325m. The European Commission on February 17, 2017. approved €14.5 million as financial support for final detailed studies prior to Project Implementation. The project is based on an undersea cable for the connection of the electricity systems of Israel, Cyprus and Greece. Its capacity will be 2000 MW and its length approximately 1518 km. It will include three connections: 329 km between Israel and Cyprus, 879 km between Cyprus and Crete and 310 km between Crete and mainland Greece. It will allow electricity transmission in both directions.

Cooperation between Israeli and Greek lobbies in the United States

A new joint action committee for the Greek-Israeli alliance was created in the U.S. Congress in early 2013. The creation and goals of the Greek-Israeli Caucus under the name Congressional Hellenic-Israel Alliance were announced at a special event held in the Congress. It is co-chaired by Congress members Gus Bilirakis the Republican representative from Florida and Ted Deutch the Democrat from Florida, and the Greek-Israeli Caucus consists of powerful members of both Republican and Democratic party. It is estimated that it may become the most important pressure group in Congress by 2014.

On 13 March 2013 in Washington the Israeli ambassador Michael Oren hosted the launching of a new congressional grouping dedicated to improving Israeli-Greek-Cypriot ties. Attending the launch were the co-chairmen of the newly established Hellenic-Israel Caucus, Ted Deutch and Gus Bilirakis as well as lawmakers including John Sarbanes and Eliot Engel, the senior Democrat on the US House of Representatives Foreign Affairs Committee. Israeli Ambassador Michael Oren in his remarks at the dinner at his residence touted shared economic and strategic interests among Greece, Cyprus and Israel. The Greek ambassador Christos Panagopoulos in Washington announced that cooperation among the three countries would bring “peace, stability and prosperity” to the region. Also addressing the event was Olympia Neocleous, the chargé d'affaires at the Cypriot embassy in Washington.

With the passing of Greek-American Leader Andrew Athens, the AJC has honored his pioneering work to advance Greek-Jewish and Hellenic-Israeli ties more than once. The most recent occasion occurred in recognition of Athens’ 90th birthday before AJC's National Board of Governors and invited guests from the political and diplomatic communities, in his hometown of Chicago in 2011. Partnering early on with his cherished friend, the late Maynard Wishner, a fellow Chicagoan and AJC national leader, Athens spearheaded a number of joint AJC and Greek-American delegations to Greece, Cyprus and Israel.

Agricultural co-operation

The arid topography of Israel has spurred Israeli scientists to develop innovative farming methods and desalination technologies. The start of an efficient desalination by Israeli scientists as planned will be a boost to many of Greece's islands such as Santorini that suffer inadequate freshwater reserves and must often rely on shipped water. Agricultural Development and Foods Minister Athanassios Tsaftaris in a visit to Israel with Israeli Agriculture and Rural Development Minister Orit Noked in 2011 emphasised that both governments are very interested in further boosting agricultural development.

Cultural relations

Many of the most prominent Orthodox Christian and Jewish interfaith officials, scholars and clerics held a three-day conference in Thessaloniki in June 2013 to discuss the crucial importance of protecting the environment and religious values and condemned events of anti-Semitism and religious prejudice around the world. The meeting had an aim to help improve even further relations between these two ancient faith communities.
Ecumenical Patriarch Bartholomew has declared 2013 the Year of Global Solidarity, thus Metropolitan Emmanuel declared: “It is well documented that Greeks living in Thessaloniki at the time of the Shoah stood with their Jewish neighbors and friends. Today, more than ever, we must stand together to battle the evils of anti-Semitism, religious prejudice and all forms of discrimination.”
The Greek Orthodox Church of Jerusalem is an autocephalous Eastern Orthodox Church within the wider communion of Eastern Orthodox Christianity and it is headed by the Patriarch of Jerusalem and it is regarded by Eastern Orthodox Christians as the mother church of all of Christendom. Christians believe that it was in Jerusalem that the Church was established on the day of Pentecost with the descent of the Holy Spirit on the disciples of Jesus Christ and that the Gospel of Christ spread from Jerusalem. The Church celebrates its liturgy in the Byzantine rite, whose original language is Koine Greek, and follows its own calendar of feasts.

Historically important is the presence of the Romaniote Jews in Greece and also in the today Israel. The Romaniotes are using the Judaeo-Greek language for centuries in their Jewish prayer liturgy.

Today with the financial help of the Onassis Foundation a faculty for Byzantine and Modern Hellenic studies in the University of Haifa has been established and many faculties for the study of the Ancient Greek Culture are spread around Israel. In 2015 a faculty for Judaic studies was opened in the Aristotle University of Thessaloniki with the financial help of the Jewish community of Thessaloniki.

Greek singers and Israel

Greek music is considered the most popular foreign genre in Israel after American and British music. Israel is the top destination for Greek music concerts alongside Germany, the United Kingdom and Cyprus. Popular Greek singers who have performed in Israel include Manolis Angelopoulos, Eleftheria Arvanitaki, George Dalaras, Haris Alexiou, Glykeria and Natassa Theodoridou. In December 2012 Natassa Theodoriou performed some of her songs in Tel Aviv Performing Arts Center in Hebrew. In 2007 during the interview of Shimon Peres by Hellenic Broadcasting Corporation on George Dalaras concert in Israel, President Peres stated: "In Israel we love the Greek music. For us Greece is a country but also a melody".

A special broadcasting day of Greek classical and modern music was organised on 12 June 2013 by the Israel Broadcasting Authority, in cooperation with the Embassy of Greece in Tel Aviv. The program started with an hourly show, presented by Ambassador Lampridis and the Director of the Radio Station Arie Yass with an emphasis on the roots and the historical evolution of modern Greek music. During the whole day, Kol Ha Musica broadcast works of modern Greek composers including Hatzidakis, Theodorakis, Spanoudakis, Remboutsika, Karaidrou, Mikroutsikos and Markopoulos. The programme also included Sephardi music from Thessaloniki and Rhodes.

The Israeli radio show Yaron Enosh is almost completely dedicated to Greece and its culture, music, philosophy and history, and has an audience of approximately 800,000 Israeli listeners. In Israel there are 12 internet radio stations that broadcast exclusively Greek music.

The Holocaust in Greece

During the Holocaust in Greece between 83 and 87 percent of Greek Jews were murdered, one of the highest proportions in Europe. 

There are 315 Greeks who have been awarded as Righteous Among the Nations, more than any other Balkan country, for risking their lives to rescue Jews during the Axis occupation of Greece. Romaniote Jews, integrated into Greek society by culture and language, fared better as they could not easily be singled out from the Christians, who in turn were more ready to resist the German authorities' demands. The Archbishop of Athens Damaskinos ordered his priests to ask their congregations to help the Jews and sent a strong-worded letter of protest to the collaborationist authorities and the Germans.

The Greek police occasionally ignored instructions to turn over Jews to the Germans. At Thessaloniki, individual policemen rescued their friends, while in Athens the chief of police, Angelos Evert and his men actively supported and rescued Jews. At Zakynthos, the commandant ordered Metropolitan Bishop Chrysostomos and Mayor Lucas Carrer to submit a list with the names of all the Jews that lived on the island, together with details of their assets within 24 hours. They gave him an envelope with only their names (bishop's and the mayor's). Not a single Jew of the 275 that lived on Zakynthos was deported. The bishop and the mayor had informed the leader of the Jewish community, Moses Ganis, of the German plans, prompting a massive operation to hide the island's Jews in villages, farms and the homes of Christians, no one betrayed them, no one confessed to knowing where they were hiding.

However, other Greeks collaborated with the Germans in the deportation of the Jews, especially against the more numerous Sephardi population, which retained distinctive language and customs. In Thessaloniki, Greek police marched almost 50,000 Sephardi Jews to the Holocaust trains, rented from the Greek railway company, that would take them to Auschwitz, where more than 95% were murdered. When Jewish community leaders appealed to collaborationist Prime Minister Ioannis Rallis, he claimed that the Jews of Thessaloniki had been guilty of subversive activities and that this was the reason they were deported.

Visits

Diplomatic missions
Since May 1991, diplomatic relations between the two countries have been upgraded from diplomatic representation to embassy level. Greece is represented in Israel through its embassy in Tel Aviv, its Consulate General in Jerusalem, and an honorary consulate in Haifa. Israel is represented in Greece through its embassy in Athens.

See also 
 Energy Triangle
 International recognition of Israel
 Greeks in Israel
 EuroAsia Interconnector
 Israel–Turkey relations
 Cyprus–Israel relations

References

External links 

 Greek Ministry of Foreign Affairs about relations with Israel
 Israel embassy in Athens
Israel, Turkey, and Greece: Uneasy Relations in the East Mediterranean By Amikam Nachmani
“Athens on the Diplomatic Offensive”, (1999), Jane's Intelligence Review, Vol.11, No.12.
Turkey and Israel:Crisis in the Horizon and the end of an Alliance? http://www.rieas.gr/index.php?option=com_content&view=article&id=1095:turkey-and-israel-crisis-in-the-horizon-and-the-end-of-an-alliance-&catid=23&Itemid=70
Turkey and Israel:Crisis in the Horizon and the end of an Alliance?Part II http://www.rieas.gr/images/mavro1.pdf
Learning Tactics and Strategies from the Strongest Lobby of the World.(By Nickolaos Mavromates) https://www.linkedin.com/pulse/learning-tactics-strategies-from-strongest-lobby-world-mavromates

 
Israel
Greece